Kevin Cummings (born December 1, 1990) is an American football coach  who is currently the wide receivers coach for the Arizona Wildcats football team. He played college football at Oregon State University.

Playing career

College
Cummings was a wide receiver and special teams player on the Oregon State teams from 2010 to 2013.<ref>Oregon State player bio, OSUBeavers.com (accessed online January 4, 2021)</ref</ref>

Professional
After college, Cummings participated in the rookie mini-camp with the San Francisco 49ers. He split the 2014 season with the Ottawa Redblacks and Edmonton Eskimos of the Canadian Football League and the Portland Thunder of the Arena Football League.

Coaching career
From 2014 to 2017, he worked in Offensive Quality Control at Oregon State.

In 2017, he followed OSU colleague Brent Brennan to San Jose State to become the wide receivers coach.

He joined the University of Arizona's coaching staff as wide receivers coach in 2021.

References

External links
 San Jose State coaching bio
 Oregon State coaching bio
 Oregon State player bio

1990 births
American football wide receivers
Living people
Oregon State Beavers football players
Edmonton Elks players
Portland Thunder players
Oregon State Beavers football coaches
San Jose State Spartans football coaches
Arizona Wildcats football coaches